The IX International Chopin Piano Competition was held from 6 to 29 October 1975 in Warsaw. The competition was won by Krystian Zimerman of Poland, the youngest winner to that date at the age of 18.

Awards 
The competition consisted of three elimination stages and a final with seven pianists.

The following prizes were awarded:

Two special prizes were awarded:

Jury 
The jury consisted of:
  
  
  
  Jan Ekier
  
  
  
  
  Andrzej Jasiński
  
  Louis Kentner
  Eugene List (vice-chairman)
  Yevgeny Malinin (vice-chairman)
  Witold Małcużyński
  
  Federico Mompou
  Frantisek Rauch
  Bernard Ringeissen
  Kazimierz Sikorski (chairman)
  
  
  Amadeus Webersinke
  Tadeusz Żmudziński

References

Further reading

External links 
 

 

International Chopin Piano Competition
1975 in music
1975 in Poland
1970s in Warsaw
October 1975 events in Europe